Charlotte Ann McKinney (born August 6, 1993) is an American model and actress who first gained attention as an Instagram personality, eventually achieving wider recognition for her appearance in a Carl's Jr. commercial which aired regionally during Super Bowl XLIX in 2015.

Life and career 
McKinney was born and raised in Orlando, Florida. After dropping out of high school at age 17, McKinney, who describes herself as "a curvier bombshell with big boobs," pursued a modeling career but struggled to find success with an agency.  Opting to rely on Instagram as a portfolio, she soon became "Insta-famous" and was profiled in Esquire. McKinney credits the social networking service as a factor in her subsequent success, which includes campaigns for the fashion brand Guess. She signed with Wilhelmina Models. She has graced the cover of numerous fashion magazines, including Jezebel, Ocean Drive GQ Mexico, Galore and Miami Living, and appeared in editorials for Social Life, Men's Health and Vanity Fair.

McKinney was the featured model in Carl's Jr.'s All Natural Burger commercial, which was released online in January 2015 and aired regionally during Super Bowl XLIX. The viral ad featured McKinney walking around a farmers' market, stating that she is "all natural" and using double entendres to imply that she is naked with strategically placed items in the market, until it reveals McKinney in a bikini eating the All Natural Burger.  The success of the commercial has led to McKinney being dubbed "the next Kate Upton," who also garnered national attention for appearing in a Carl's Jr. commercial during a Super Bowl.

On February 24, 2015, McKinney was announced as one of the celebrities who would compete on season 20 of Dancing with the Stars. Her professional partner was Keoikantse Motsepe. The couple was the second to be eliminated and finished in 11th place.

McKinney appeared as Missy in the film Joe Dirt 2: Beautiful Loser (2015). In 2017, she appeared in the film adaptation of Baywatch and the remake of Flatliners.

Filmography

Film

Television

Music videos

References

External links 

1993 births
21st-century American actresses
Actresses from Orlando, Florida
American female models
American Internet celebrities
Female models from Florida
Living people